Rosmarie Agathe Erentrudis von Trapp (February 8, 1929 – May 13, 2022) was an American singer, teacher, and missionary. She was the first daughter of Maria von Trapp and Georg von Trapp.

References

1929 births
2022 deaths
20th-century American women singers
20th-century American singers
21st-century American women singers
21st-century American singers
20th-century American educators
21st-century American educators
Rosmarie
American people of Austrian descent